The Packard Cavalier  is an automobile produced by the Packard Motor Car Company of Detroit, Michigan during 1953 and 1954.  Produced only as a four-door sedan, the Cavalier took the place of the Packard 300 model that was fielded in 1951 and 1952 as Packard's mid-range priced vehicle.

1953

The 1953 Cavalier was easily identified from other Packards by its unique chrome side spear trim.

Packard also created a Cavalier sub-series under which three other Packard models, marketed under various names were grouped:
 Packard Caribbean 2-door convertible based on the Packard Pan-American show car featuring coachwork by Mitchell-Bentley of Utica, Michigan
 Packard Mayfair which was based on the two-door Clipper Deluxe, but featuring higher interior luxury through fabrics and chrome trim.

A convertible model, using Cavalier trim, was offered during the 1953 model year and was priced lower than the Caribbean.

1954

For 1954, the Cavalier was again offered as a four-door sedan only, but the range also lost its sub series, and the Caribbean was moved into the senior Packard line where it remained until Packard transferred manufacturing to South Bend in 1956. The 1954 Cavalier featured "slash" trim on the rear doors. It used the same  wheelbase as the premium level Patrician series, but with the straight-eight engine as in the Clipper.

For the 1955 model year, the Cavalier name was retired and the line was absorbed into the Packard Clipper Custom series.

References

Cavalier
Cars introduced in 1953
Rear-wheel-drive vehicles